Harttiella crassicauda is a species of armored catfish.

This species is only known from its type locality, the IJs-creek in the Nassau Mountains, in the Marowijne River drainage in Suriname. It has been found in a little forest creek over sandy and rocky bottoms. This fish was previously thought to be extinct after not being sighted for 50 years; however, this fish has since been re-discovered. This fish is not currently on the IUCN Red List.

This species reaches a length of  SL. Sexual dimorphism is similar to that of Harttia, in which mature males develop hypertrophied odontodes on the pectoral spines, along the margin of the snout, and on the entire body except for the abdominal region.

References

Harttiini
Taxa named by Marinus Boeseman
Fish described in 1953
Fish of Suriname